Melinaea ludovica is a species of butterfly of the family Nymphalidae found in South America.

Subspecies
Melinaea ludovica ludovica (Suriname, Guianas)
Melinaea ludovica paraiya Reakirt, 1866 (Amazon, Brazil: Rio de Janeiro, Santa Catarina)
Melinaea ludovica manuelito Tessmann, 1928 (Peru)

References

Butterflies described in 1780
Ithomiini
Fauna of Brazil
Nymphalidae of South America